Daniel Curley (October 4, 1918 – December 30, 1988) was an American novelist and short story writer.

Life
He was a native of East Bridgewater, Massachusetts. He was accepted and matriculated at the Massachusetts Institute of Technology (MIT), but transferred to, and graduated from the University of Alabama.
He taught at the University of Illinois at Urbana-Champaign. He lived in Urbana, Illinois. Roger Ebert was a student, and recalled that Curley "introduced me to many of the cornerstones of my life's reading: 'The Love Song of J. Alfred Prufrock', Crime and Punishment, Madame Bovary, The Ambassadors, Nostromo, The Professor's House, The Great Gatsby, The Sound and the Fury. One day he handed out a mimeographed booklet of poems by E. E. Cummings, and told us told us to consider the typography as musical notations for reading the poems aloud. Cummings ever after was clear to me, and I know dozens of his poems by heart. He approached these works with undisguised admiration. We discussed felicities of language, patterns of symbolism, motivation, revelation of character." Ebert writes "I was to take every class Curley offered, including Fiction Writing, where one of the other students was Larry Woiwode, then obviously already the real thing. Curley read our stories aloud anonymously, to encourage open discussion. There was never any doubt who wrote Woiwode's." Woiwode would go on to be the Poet Laureate of North Dakota.

He married and had four daughters, and a stepdaughter.

Awards
 1985 Flannery O'Connor Award for Short Fiction for Living With Snakes

Works
 
 
 
 
 
 
 
 A Stone Man, Michael Joseph, 1964.
 How Many Angels, Beacon Press, 1958
 That Marriage Bed of Procrustes Beacon Press, (1957),

Anthologies

References

External links

1918 births
1988 deaths
20th-century American novelists
Novelists from Massachusetts
University of Alabama alumni
University of Illinois Urbana-Champaign faculty
American male novelists
American male short story writers
20th-century American short story writers
20th-century American male writers
Novelists from Illinois
Massachusetts Institute of Technology alumni